The Rural Municipality of Medstead No. 497 is a rural municipality (RM) in the Canadian province of Saskatchewan within Census Division No. 16 and  Division No. 6.

History 
The RM of Medstead No. 497 incorporated as a rural municipality on January 1, 1913.

Geography

Communities and localities 
The following urban municipalities are surrounded by the RM.

Villages
 Medstead

The following unincorporated communities are within the RM.

Localities
 Avery
 Belbutte
 Birch Lake
 Cater
 Glenbush
 Park Bluff

Demographics 

Attractions 
 Helen Lake Provincial Recreation Site
 Little Loon Regional Park

Government 
The RM of Medstead No. 497 is governed by an elected municipal council and an appointed administrator that meets on the second Friday of every month. The reeve of the RM is Ronald Jesse while its administrator is Christin Egeland. The RM's office is located in Medstead.

Transportation 
 Saskatchewan Highway 3
 Saskatchewan Highway 794
 Canadian Pacific Railway (abandoned)

See also 
List of rural municipalities in Saskatchewan

References 

M

Division No. 16, Saskatchewan